Transcription factor RelB is a protein that in humans is encoded by the RELB gene.

Interactions 

RELB has been shown to interact with NFKB2, NFKB1, and C22orf25.

Activation and function 

In resting cells, RelB is sequestered by the NF-κB precursor protein p100 in the cytoplasm. A select set of TNF-R superfamily members, including lymphotoxin β-receptor (LTβR), BAFF-R, CD40 and RANK, activate the non-canonical NF-κB pathway. In this pathway, NIK stimulates the processing of p100 into p52, which in association with RelB appears in the nucleus as RelB:p52 NF-κB heterodimers. RelB:p52 activates the expression homeostatic lymphokines, which instruct lymphoid organogenesis and determine the trafficking of naive lymphocytes in the secondary lymphoid organs.

Recent studies has suggested that the functional non-canonical NF-κB pathway is modulated by canonical NF-κB signalling. For example, syntheses of the constituents of the non-canonical pathway, viz RelB and p52, are controlled by canonical IKK2-IκB-RelA:p50 signalling. Moreover, generation of  canonical and non-canonical dimers, viz RelA:p50 and RelB:p52, within the cellular milieu are mechanistically interlinked. These analyses suggest that an integrated NF-κB system network underlies activation of both RelA and RelB containing dimer and that a malfunctioning canonical pathway will lead to an aberrant cellular response also through the non-canonical pathway.

Most intriguingly, a recent study identified that TNF-induced canonical signalling subverts non-canonical RelB:p52 activity in the inflamed lymphoid tissues limiting lymphocyte ingress. Mechanistically, TNF inactivated NIK in LTβR‐stimulated cells and induced the synthesis of Nfkb2 mRNA encoding p100; these together potently accumulated unprocessed p100, which attenuated the RelB activity. A role of p100/Nfkb2 in dictating lymphocyte ingress in the inflamed lymphoid tissue may have broad physiological implications.

See also 
 NF-κB

References

Further reading 

 
 
 
 
 
 
 
 
 
 
 
 
 
 
 
 
 
 
 

Transcription factors